Neoglyptus is a genus of beetles in the family Carabidae, containing the following species:

 Neoglyptus abyssinicus (Burgeon, 1936) 
 Neoglyptus aciculatus Lecordier, 1968 
 Neoglyptus bayeri (Burgeon, 1936) 
 Neoglyptus brevicornis (Peringuey, 1896) 
 Neoglyptus congoensis (Burgeon, 1936)
 Neoglyptus pectinatus (Alluaud, 1926) 
 Neoglyptus punctulatus (Chaudoir, 1862)

References

Orthogoniinae